Košarkaški klub Crikvenica is a professional basketball club based in Crikvenica, Croatia.

Notable players 
 Goran Vrbanc

External links
Official Website

Basketball teams in Croatia
Basketball teams established in 1975
Basketball teams in Yugoslavia